Events of the year 1968 in Brazil

Incumbents

Federal government 
 President: Marshal Artur da Costa e Silva
 Vice-President: Pedro Aleixo

Governors 
 Acre: vacant
 Alagoas: Antônio Simeão de Lamenha Filho 
 Amazonas: Danilo Duarte de Matos Areosa
 Bahia: Luís Viana Filho 
 Ceará: Plácido Castelo
 Espírito Santo: Cristiano Dias Lopes Filho 
 Goiás: Otávio Lage
 Guanabara: Francisco Negrão de Lima
 Maranhão: Jose Sarney 
 Mato Grosso: Pedro Pedrossian 
 Minas Gerais: Israel Pinheiro da Silva 
 Pará: Alacid Nunes 
 Paraíba: João Agripino Maia 
 Paraná: Pablo Cruz Pimentel 
 Pernambuco: Nilo Coelho
 Piauí: Helvídio Nunes
 Rio de Janeiro: Geremias de Mattos Fontes
 Rio Grande do Norte: Walfredo Gurgel Dantas 
 Rio Grande do Sul: Walter Peracchi Barcelos 
 Santa Catarina: Ivo Silveira 
 São Paulo: Roberto Costa de Abreu Sodré 
 Sergipe: Lourival Baptista

Vice governors
 Alagoas: Manoel Sampaio Luz 
 Amazonas: Rui Arajuo 
 Bahia: Jutahy Magalhães 
 Ceará: Humberto Ellery
 Espírito Santo: Isaac Lopes Rubim 
 Goiás: Osires Teixeira 
 Maranhão: Antonio Jorge Dino
 Mato Grosso: Lenine de Campos Póvoas 
 Minas Gerais: Pio Soares Canedo 
 Pará: João Renato Franco 
 Paraíba: Antônio Juarez Farias 
 Paraná: Plínio Franco Ferreira da Costa 
 Pernambuco: Salviano Machado Filho 
 Piauí: João Clímaco d'Almeida 
 Rio de Janeiro: Heli Ribeiro Gomes
 Rio Grande do Norte: Clóvis Motta
 Santa Catarina: Jorge Bornhausen 
 São Paulo: Hilário Torloni 
 Sergipe: vacant

Events

March 
 28 March – Student Edson Luís de Lima Souto is shot dead by a police officer in a protest at the restaurant Calabouço, in Rio de Janeiro.

May 
 26 May – Doctor Euryclides de Jesus Zerbini performs the first heart transplant in Latin America.
 28 May – A 23rd star representing the state of Acre, established six years before, is added to the flag of Brazil.

June 
 26 June – March of the One Hundred Thousand held in Rio de Janeiro against the military dictatorship.

November 
 2 November – Queen Elizabeth II visits Brazil.

December 
 13 December – Institucional Act Number 5 (AI-5) proclaimed, giving the president the powers to intervene on local governments, suspend the Congress, ban political meetings, and censor the press, music and film.

Births 
 20 July – Carlos Saldanha, director
 18 November – Luizianne Lins, politician

Deaths 
 4 April – Assis Chateaubriand, entrepreneur (b. 1892).
 13 October – Manuel Bandeira, poet (b. 1886).

References

See also 
1968 in Brazilian football
1968 in Brazilian television

 
1960s in Brazil
Years of the 20th century in Brazil
Brazil
Brazil